Zhou were historical administrative and political divisions of China. Formally established during the Han dynasty, zhou existed continuously  in 1912—a period of over 2000 years.

Overview
Zhou is typically rendered by several terms in the English language:

 The large zhou before the Tang dynasty and in countries other than China are called "provinces"
 The smaller zhou during and after the Tang dynasty are called "prefectures"
 The zhou of the Qing dynasty are also called either "independent" or "dependent departments", depending on their level.

The Tang dynasty also established fǔ ("prefectures"), zhou of special importance such as capitals and other major cities.  By the Ming and Qing,  became predominant divisions within Chinese provinces. In Ming and Qing, the word fǔ was typically attached to the name of each prefecture's capital city, thus both Chinese and Western maps and geographical works would often call the respective cities Hangzhou-fu, Wenzhou-fu, Wuchang-fu, etc.

Following the Meiji Restoration, fu was also used in Japanese for the urban prefectures of the most important cities; today, it is still used in the Japanese names for the Osaka and Kyoto Prefectures.

In the People's Republic of China, zhou today exists only in the designation "autonomous prefecture", administrative areas for China's designated minorities. However, zhou have left a huge mark on Chinese place names, including the province of Guizhou and the major cities of Guangzhou, Fuzhou, Hangzhou, Lanzhou, and Suzhou, among many others. Likewise, although modern Korean, Vietnamese, and Japanese provinces are no longer designated by zhou cognates, the older terms survive in various place names, notably the Japanese islands of Honshu and Kyushu, the Korean province Jeju-do, and Lai Châu in Vietnam.

History

Zhou were first mentioned in ancient Chinese texts, notably the Yu Gong or Tribute of Yu, section of the Book of Documents. All agreed on the division of China into nine zhou, though they differed on their names and position. These zhou were geographical concepts, not administrative entities.

The Han dynasty was the first to formalize the zhou into actual administrative divisions by establishing 13 zhou all across China. Because these zhou were the largest divisions of the China at the time, they are usually translated as "provinces". After the Han Dynasty, however, the number of zhou began to increase. By the time of the Sui dynasty, there were over a hundred zhou all across China.

Henceforth, zhou were lowered to second-level status, and the word becomes translated into English as "prefecture". Thereafter, zhou continued to survive as second- or third-level political divisions until the Qing dynasty.

 The People's Republic of China recycled the name, using it to refer to the autonomous prefectures granted to various ethnicities.

See also 
 Administrative divisions of China
 Provinces of China

References 

Administrative divisions of ancient China

Types of administrative division
Subdivisions of Korea